Isochariesthes breuningstefi is a species of beetle in the family Cerambycidae. It was described by Pierre Téocchi in 1985, originally under the genus Pseudochariesthes.

References

breuningstefi
Beetles described in 1985